Margaret Maher Robinson is an American mathematician specializing in number theory and the theory of zeta functions. She is the Julia and Sarah Ann Adams Professor of Mathematics at Mount Holyoke College.

Education and career
Robinson graduated from Bowdoin College in 1979, and earned her Ph.D. in 1986 from Johns Hopkins University. Her dissertation, On the Complex Powers Associated with the Twisted Cases of the Determinant and the Pfaffian, was supervised by Jun-Ichi Igusa.

She taught briefly at Hampshire College before joining the Mount Holyoke faculty.

Recognition
In 2013 she was one of the winners of the Deborah and Franklin Haimo Awards for Distinguished College or University Teaching of Mathematics. Her award citation credited her undergraduate mentorship through Research Experiences for Undergraduates, and her intensive summer programs for young women in number theory.

In 2020, she will be the recipient of the M. Gweneth Humphreys Award, given by the Association for Women in Mathematics. The award states that Robinson "has been a mainstay of thoughtful teaching and mentoring for many years at Mount Holyoke College, an institution whose mission is to educate women. Her focus is not just on the top students, but on making a meaningful (and joyful) mathematical intervention for all the generations of learners that have crossed her path."

References

Year of birth missing (living people)
Living people
21st-century American mathematicians
Women mathematicians
Number theorists
Bowdoin College alumni
Johns Hopkins University alumni
Hampshire College faculty
Mount Holyoke College faculty
20th-century American mathematicians